In enzymology, a 3-hydroxyisobutyrate dehydrogenase also known as β-hydroxyisobutyrate dehydrogenase or 3-hydroxyisobutyrate dehydrogenase, mitochondrial (HIBADH) is an enzyme that in humans is encoded by the HIBADH gene.

3-Hydroxyisobutyrate dehydrogenase catalyzes the chemical reaction:

3-hydroxy-2-methylpropanoate + NAD+  2-methyl-3-oxopropanoate + NADH + H+

Thus, the two substrates of this enzyme are 3-hydroxy-2-methylpropanoate and NAD+, whereas its 3 products are 2-methyl-3-oxopropanoate, NADH, and H+.

This enzyme belongs to the family of oxidoreductases, specifically those acting on the CH-OH group of donor with NAD+ or NADP+ as acceptor. The systematic name of this enzyme class is 3-hydroxy-2-methylpropanoate:NAD+ oxidoreductase. This enzyme participates in valine, leucine and isoleucine degradation.

Function 

3-hydroxyisobutyrate dehydrogenase is a tetrameric mitochondrial enzyme that catalyzes the NAD+-dependent, reversible oxidation of 3-hydroxyisobutyrate, an intermediate of valine catabolism, to methylmalonate semialdehyde.

Structural studies

References

Further reading

External links
 
 PDBe-KB provides an overview of all the structure information available in the PDB for Human 3-hydroxyisobutyrate dehydrogenase, mitochondrial

EC 1.1.1
NADH-dependent enzymes
Enzymes of known structure
Human proteins